With the Eyes of a Woman (German: Mit den Augen einer Frau) is a 1942 German drama film directed by Karl Georg Külb and starring Ada Tschechowa, Olga Tschechowa and Gustav Fröhlich.

The film's sets were designed by the art director Willy Schiller. It was shot at the Althoff Studios in Berlin.

Main cast
 Ada Tschechowa as Marie-Luise von Ditmar - 18 Jahre 
 Olga Tschechowa as Marie-Louise von Ditmar, Baronin von Stein 
 Gustav Fröhlich as Paul von Detky 
 Karl Martell as Rolf von Schenk 
 Franz Schafheitlin as Baron von Stein 
 Fritz Wagner as Jan Collander 
 Marina von Ditmar as Clari 
 Erika von Thellmann as Frau von Ditmar 
 Hilde von Stolz as Cora Solani 
 Maly Delschaft as Frau von Purkhammer 
 Paul Bildt as Gutsbesitzer von Ditmar
 Elga Brink as Frau von Schenk 
 Olga Limburg as Baronin von Jeschkow
 Rudolf Schündler as Werner 
 Julia Serda as Tante Clarissa 
 Klaus Pohl as Theaterinspizient

References

Bibliography 
 Bock, Hans-Michael & Bergfelder, Tim. The Concise Cinegraph: Encyclopaedia of German Cinema. Berghahn Books, 2009.

External links 
 

1942 films
1942 drama films
Films of Nazi Germany
German drama films
1940s German-language films
Films directed by Karl Georg Külb
Films based on Hungarian novels
German black-and-white films
Films shot at Althoff Studios
1930s German films